Savad Jan (also Romanized as Savād Jān; also known as Savār Jān) is a village in Hureh Rural District, Saman County, Chaharmahal and Bakhtiari Province, Iran. At the 2006 census, its population was 1,389, in 370 families. The village is populated by Turkic people.

References 

Populated places in Saman County